D-A-D is a Danish rock band. They were originally named Disneyland After Dark, but changed their name to avoid a lawsuit from The Walt Disney Company.

History 
In the early 1980s in Copenhagen, D-A-D started playing together under their original name Disneyland After Dark. Pedersen came up with the name based on the idea that when the lights are out in Disneyland, anything can happen. The first lineup of D-A-D consisted of Jesper, Stig, Peter and Stig's girlfriend, Lene Glumer. The band's debut concert was at the youth club Sundby Algaard. In December 1982, Lene Glumer left the band and the three of them kept playing together and on 3 March. 1984 Jesper's younger brother, Jacob, joined the band at a concert at Musikcaféen in Copenhagen.

The band released their first album, Call of the Wild in 1986.

The group made their international breakthrough in 1989 with the record No Fuel Left for the Pilgrims on Warner Records, which was released on the band's fifth birthday. They achieved some airplay with the single "Sleeping My Day Away".

The current lineup is Jesper Binzer, Jacob Binzer, Stig Pedersen and Laust Sonne.

The largest concert the band played as the opening act for the Böhse Onkelz on their farewell festival on 17 June 2005, about 120,000 people on the Euro Speedway Lausitz.

Band members 
Jesper Binzer
Birth: 4 September 1965
Position: lead vocals, guitar, banjo, and backing vocals.
Binzer is from Frederiksberg like Laust Sonne. He was one of the founders of the band in 1982. He also plays drums for the band The Whiteouts and has also written a song for the Danish movie Bleeder.

Jacob Binzer
Birth: 28 October 1966
Position: Lead guitar, backing vocals, kazoo, piano, and keyboards.
Nickname: Cobber
Jesper Binzer's younger brother. He is from Frederiksberg. Jacob has played in the band since 1984.

Stig Pedersen
Birth: 18 May 1965
Position: Bass guitar, lead vocals and backing vocals.
Stig is from Amager and use to play in a punk band called ADS and also plays in a band called Hellbetty. A notable aspect of Pedersen's bass playing is his use of almost exclusively two-stringed bass guitars; his basses often take extravagant shapes, such as an iPhone whose screen shows the audience.

Laust Sonne
Birth: 11 December 1974
Position: drums, backing vocals, vibraphone, keyboards, guitar, saxophone, xylophone, and bass guitar.
Sonne is from Frederiksberg. He has played in the band since 1999. He also plays in the bands Dear and Bugpowder.

Line-up history

Discography

Albums 
Studio albums

Live albums

Compilation albums

Extended plays

Singles

Tours 
Scare Yourself Alive Tour (2005–2006)
D-A-D Tour 2007 (2007)
D-A-D Tour 2008 (2008)
Monster Philosophy Tour (2009)
D-A-D Tour 2010 (2010)
D-A-D Tour 2011 (2011)
Fast On Wheels Tour (2012)
D-A-D Tour 2013 (2013)
D-A-D Tour 2015 (2015)

See also 
List of glam metal bands and artists

References

External links 

 
 

1982 establishments in Denmark
Danish glam metal musical groups
Danish hard rock musical groups
Musical groups established in 1982